Ostension is the act of showing or demonstrating something.

In communication
In communication theory and especially in relevance theory, ostensive behaviour or ostension is a behaviour that signals the intention to communicate something. This can be a gesture such as pointing, or shifting position to draw an addressee's attention to something.

Verbal communication (the act of speaking or writing something) is also ostensive behaviour, as it draws the addressee's attention to the fact that the communicator intends to convey some information. This is called the communicative intention. By contrast, the informative intention is the intention to convey said information, i.e. the actual content of the message.

In folklore
The term ostension is also used by those who study folklore and urban legends to indicate real-life happenings that parallel the events told in pre-existing and well-established legends and lore. Semiotician Umberto Eco was the first to use the term to describe the way in which people communicate messages through miming actions, as by holding up a pack of cigarettes to say, "Would you like one?" The concept was applied to contemporary legends by folklorists Linda Dégh and Andrew Vázsonyi, who argued that the most direct form of ostension involved committing an actual crime mentioned in a well-known urban legend, such as microwaving someone's pet animal or placing poison in a child's Halloween candy. While such events are rare, the authors stressed that folklorists must recognize "that fact can become narrative and narrative can become fact."

Dégh and Vázsonyi, followed by other analysts, argued that there were two other forms of ostension that did not necessarily involve literal acting out of legends.

Quasi-ostension involves interpretation of ambiguous events in terms of a legend, as when a murder is first believed to have been a "cult" sacrifice or "gang" murder when in fact the perpetrator had other motives. Many local media panics are based in this form of ostension.

Pseudo-ostension involves legend-like events intentionally acted out by persons aware of the original narrative. For example, in 1991, Ebony published a letter written by "C.J." a Dallas-area woman who said she was HIV-positive, but intentionally having sex with as many men as possible. Soon after, a local radio talk-show broadcast a phone call from a woman who said she was the real "C.J." "I blame it on men, period," she said to the talk-show host. "I'm doing it to all the men because it was a man that gave it to me." After a huge spike in males seeking HIV screening in the Dallas-Fort-Worth area, both the author of the letter and the talk-show caller were identified as hoaxers intending to raise consciousness of the disease.

Ostension has become an important concept for folklorists studying the ways in which folklore affects everyday people's real lives, ranging from supernatural rituals such as legend tripping to the complex ways in which awareness of AIDS has affected people's sexual habits. Folklorist John McDowell, in an article preceding Dégh and Vázsonyi by a year, explored the relationship between iconicity—representation—and ostension—presentation—in mythic narrative, finding in episodes of ostention a virtual encounter with the experiential substrate, an experience that he termed "narrative epiphany".

See also

 Archetype
 Exemplification
 Legend tripping

Notes

References

Further reading
 Ostension: Word Learning and the Embodied Mind. Cambridge, MA: The MIT Press, 2014

Communication theory
Human communication
Linguistics